Rehberg may refer to:

Places
 Rehberg, a neighborhood of Krems an der Donau, Lower Austria
 Rehberg, part of the Spantekow municipality in Vorpommern-Greifswald, Germany
 Rehberg (Harz), the 4th highest mountain in Lower Saxony, Germany
 Rehberg (Wasgau), the highest hill on German soil in the Franco-German Wasgau uplands
 German name of Liberk
 German name of Srní (Klatovy District)

Other uses
Rehberg (surname)